Robert Constantin "Bobby" Permane (January 21, 1924 – October 24, 2017) was a Thoroughbred horse racing jockey whose successful career included riding future Hall of Fame inductee Stymie to thirteen wins. Fittingly, in 1951 Permane won the Stymie Purse at Bowie Race Track in Maryland.

Entertainment career
Robert Permane was born in Camden, New Jersey to parents who were vaudeville performers. At age eight he was competing in equestrian events for ponies. Prior to embarking on his career as a jockey in Thoroughbred racing he had success as a singer, performing on radio and touring the United States and Australia.

Jockey career
In August 1943 Permane made his professional riding debut at Garden State Park Racetrack in Cherry Hill, New Jersey where on August 31 he earned his first win. The following year he was the leading jockey at Tropical Park Race Track in Miami, Florida. In April, during the track's 1944 spring meet, Permane rode a record five winners three days in a row. Permane was also second in total wins in New York State in 1944 and third in 1948. He was severely injured in March 1949 in a racing accident at Gulfstream Park which would require eight operations that put him out of racing for fifteen months, not returning until June 3, 1950.

Among his other major successes, Robert Permane won the 1944 Jockey Club Gold Cup aboard Bolingbroke, and the 1946 Santa Anita Derby for Maine Chance Farm aboard Knockdown. Then, in the U.S. Triple Crown races, he rode Knockdown to a fifth place finish in the 1946 Kentucky Derby and to fourth in the Preakness Stakes. In 1947 Permane won the Hollywood Gold Cup and Sunset Handicap aboard Cover Up and in 1950 rode the filly Busanda to victory in the Alabama Stakes.

When his racing career was over, Robert Permane and his wife made their home in Florida where they built Carlyn Estates Trailer Park in Palmetto. He died on October 24, 2017 at age 93.

References

1924 births
2017 deaths
American male singers
Vaudeville performers
American businesspeople
American jockeys
People from Camden, New Jersey